Ray Mortenson (born 1944) is an American artist photographer who has been documenting the metropolitan corridor of the US' northeastern landscape since the late 1970s. 

Mortenson is best known for his black and white photographs of the industrial tidal marshes in the New Jersey Meadowlands and abandoned buildings in The Bronx, taken in the early 1980s. His work is in the permanent collections of a number of important institutions and has been shown in numerous solo and group exhibitions since 1981.

Work
Mortenson is best known for his black and white photographs of the industrial tidal marshes in the New Jersey Meadowlands and abandoned buildings in The Bronx, taken in the early 1980s. Studying isolated natural areas bordering urban centers, he has documented numerous small lakes and ponds, the Atlantic Ocean, weeds, and extraordinary rocks. Some of his photographs are made in intimate sizes and others as large-scale works.

Mortenson's book Meadowland (1984) was one of the last publications by Ralph Gibson’s Lustrum Press (1970–1984), at that time one of the few independent presses dedicated solely to fine art photography. Lustrum Press published monographs of then-unknown photographers such as Larry Clark, Danny Seymour and Mary Ellen Mark. Historian Gerry Badger called Lustrum “arguably the best of the small American photobook publishers of the 1970s.”

Publication
Meadowland: Photographs of New Jersey. New York: Lustrum, 1984. .

Exhibitions
Books in DIY: Photographers & Books, Cleveland Museum of Art, Cleveland, OH, 2012
All That Glitters is Not Gold, Center for Creative Photography, Tucson, AZ, 2014

Collections
Mortenson's work is held in the following permanent collections:
Addison Gallery of American Art
Art Institute of Chicago
Canadian Centre for Architecture
Center for Creative Photography, Arizona
Cleveland Museum of Art
Los Angeles County Museum of Art
Metropolitan Museum of Art, New York
Museum of the City of New York

References

External links

Meadowland Journal Art Project
Gallery representation

1944 births
American photographers
Living people